Belan may refer to:

People
Belan (surname)

Places 
Belan, County Kildare, a civil parish in County Kildare, Ireland
Belan, Kurdistan, a village in Kurdistan Province, Iran
Belan, Powys, a hamlet in Powys, Wales
Belan River, Uttar Pradesh, India
Belan-sur-Ource, a commune in the Côte-d'Or department of eastern France
Fort Belan, a coastal fortress in Gwynedd, North Wales

Other
In some South Asian languages, a Rolling pin
a type of wine grape otherwise known as Grenache blanc

See also